Colegio Miraflores 
Colegio Miraflores is a network of private schools located in Mexico

Schools
State of Mexico:
Colegio Miraflores (Nacaulpan)
Colegio Miraflores Ángel Matute (Nacaulpan) - Serves preschool (preescolar) through senior high school (bachillerato)
Colegio Miraflores Toluca (Toluca) - Serves preschool through middle school (secundaria)

Guanajuato:
Colegio Miraflores León - Preschool through senior high

Morelos:
Colegio Miraflores Cuernavaca - Preschool through senior high

There are also affiliated schools in Cape Verde and Ourense, Spain.

References

External links
Colegio Miraflores 

Private schools in Mexico
High schools in the State of Mexico